The 2021 Polish Super Cup was the 31st Polish Super Cup, an annual Polish football match played between the reigning winners of the Ekstraklasa and Polish Cup. The Ekstraklasa champions Legia Warsaw faced Polish Cup winners Raków Częstochowa.

Raków played their first ever Super Cup match, while Legia was playing to win their fifth Super Cup.

Cracovia were the defending champions, but failed to qualify to the match indicated.

The match finished with a 1–1 draw after regular time. There was no extra-time played. Raków won 4–3 on penalties.

Match

See also
2020–21 Ekstraklasa 
2020–21 Polish Cup

References

2021
2021–22 in Polish football
Sports competitions in Warsaw
August 2021 events in Poland
Polish Super Cup 2021